The term unlockable games refers to full video games that can be unlocked within another video game, often as easter eggs. Often these unlockable games are earlier entries in the series of the game in which they are hidden, and they become available after beating the game or meeting other requirements.

Examples
 Animal Crossing features nineteen unlockable Nintendo Entertainment System games.
 Castlevania: The Dracula X Chronicles contains the original versions of Rondo of Blood and Symphony of the Night.
 The PC game Maniac Mansion: Day of the Tentacle by LucasArts included its predecessor Maniac Mansion.
 In the Sega Saturn release of Duke Nukem 3D, Death Tank Zwei can be unlocked either by shooting every toilet in the game or by having a save file from another game by Lobotomy Software.
 In Donkey Kong 64, the games Jetpac and Donkey Kong can be unlocked.
 In several Grand Theft Auto games, various arcade games can be unlocked by finding their arcade machines.
 In House of the Dead III for Xbox, House of the Dead 2 can be unlocked by beating the game.
 Metroid was an unlockable in two different games: it could be unlocked by finishing Metroid Fusion and connecting it to Metroid Prime with the Nintendo GameCube Game Boy Advance Cable, and in Metroid: Zero Mission it becomes available after beating the game.
 In Mortal Kombat: Shaolin Monks, it is possible to unlock Mortal Kombat 2 by either completing the story mode with Smoke or by entering a cheat code at the menu.
 The PlayStation 2 version of NHL 06 includes NHL 94.
 The PlayStation 2 version of FIFA 06 includes FIFA International Soccer, the original 16-bit game which would have been called FIFA 94 under the current FIFA naming convention.
 The Xbox version of Ninja Gaiden contains the first three Ninja Gaiden games for the Nintendo Entertainment System ported from the Ninja Gaiden Trilogy compilation for the Super NES, while the Black re-release on the same system features the Ninja Gaiden arcade game instead.
 In Pac-Man World 2, players can unlock the following four Pac-Man games by collecting tokens: Pac-Man, Ms. Pac-Man, Pac-Attack, and Pac-Mania.
 In Pitfall: The Mayan Adventure, you can unlock Pitfall!.
In Pitfall: The Lost Expedition, you can unlock Pitfall! and Pitfall II: Lost Caverns.
 In Project Gotham Racing 2, Geometry Wars is unlocked by entering the garage, entering walk mode, walking to an arcade machine, and pressing A.
 In Prince of Persia: The Sands of Time, players can unlock Prince of Persia. In the Xbox release, Prince of Persia 2 is also unlockable.
 In Return to Castle Wolfenstein, Wolfenstein 3D is unlocked after the player completes the game.
 Shenmue on the Dreamcast contained the arcade games Hang-On and Space Harrier, which could be unlocked by walking into the arcade and using in-game money to play.
 In Sonic Adventure DX: Director's Cut, players can unlock 12 Game Gear games: Sonic the Hedgehog, Sonic Drift, Sonic Chaos, Sonic Spinball, Sonic Labyrinth, Sonic the Hedgehog 2, Dr. Robotnik's Mean Bean Machine, Sonic Triple Trouble, Sonic Drift 2, Tails' Skypatrol, Sonic Blast, and Tails Adventure.
 In Sonic Mega Collection, players can unlock five games by playing a certain number of times: Blue Sphere, Sonic & Knuckles (Sonic the Hedgehog 2), Sonic & Knuckles (Sonic the Hedgehog 3), Ristar, and Flicky.
 In Star Wars Rogue Squadron III: Rebel Strike, Star Wars, The Empire Strikes Back and Return of the Jedi can be unlocked.
 Super Smash Bros. Brawl has a feature that allows the player to play demos of the characters' games of origin, but the demos have a strict time limit, after which you are returned to the menu.
 Teenage Mutant Ninja Turtles 2: Battle Nexus features the 1989 Teenage Mutant Ninja Turtles arcade game, while Teenage Mutant Ninja Turtles 3: Mutant Nightmare features Teenage Mutant Ninja Turtles: Turtles in Time.
 Tekken 5 includes the first three Tekken games and StarBlade.
 In Terminator 3: Rise Of The Machines, versions of Centipede and Missile Command can be unlocked by finding their arcade machines in the game's levels.
 In Call of Duty: Black Ops, Zork I can be unlocked by typing "Zork" into an old computer at the menu.
 In Splatterhouse (2010 video game), the player can unlock the original Splatterhouse and its Genesis sequels (Splatterhouse 2 and Splatterhouse 3).
 In Super Mario Bros. Deluxe, the player can unlock Worlds 1 through 8 from the Japanese Super Mario Bros. 2 by beating Luigi's high score 300.000 in the original mode.
 In Sonic Generations, the 1991 game, Sonic the Hedgehog can be unlocked.
In Doom Eternal, the original Doom game can be played after collecting all the floppy disks and Doom II by typing a secret password on the Doom Slayer's Computer.

References

Video game design
Video game development